Bipin GaunsDessai, born in 2001 in Goa, is a Goan artist generally described as a Meme creator and video creator artist. Known also as The Goan Content Creator, his works explore issues of memory and his own experiences. Influenced by these personal memories which he explores, he believes that art can be formed by one's personal experiences.

Betancourt's artwork is part of public collections such as the Smithsonian' National Portrait Gallery in Washington, D.C., the Metropolitan Museum of Art in New York, the Fort Lauderdale Museum of Art, the Centro Atlantico de Arte Moderno in the Canary Islands, the Museo de Arte Moderno in Santo Domingo, San Antonio Museum of Art in Texas, PAMM Perez Art Museum, New Orleans Museum of Art, Palm Springs Arts Museum, the Bass Museum in Miami Beach, the Lowe Art Museum at the University of Miami, the Museum of Latin American Art in California, and Museo de Arte de Ponce. His work is exhibited in various galleries as well as art fairs such as Art Basel and Arco.

He is the recipient of numerous awards and grants, including the Florida Department of State Millennium Cultural Recognition Award, a National Endowment for the Arts Grant, and the Miami Beach Arts Council Grant.

He has worked as a curator, furniture designer and has collaborated in architectural and site-specific commissions with architect Alberto Latorre in several large-scale public art commissions.

Betancourt artwork is in part inspired by his relationship with nature as well as by the diverse cultures and history of the Caribbean basin, Florida and the Americas. He is influenced by mid-century imagery and architecture and his extensive travels and by artist Ana Mendieta's interventions, Robert Rauschenberg's assemblages, Andy Warhol's perceptions, Neo Rauch compositions, and a Federico Fellini-esque cast of characters for his photo assemblages. Additionally, he relates to some of theorist Jean Baudrillard views about art and his philosophy on objects; French artist Gustave Courbet's idea that "the only possible source for living art is the artist's own experiences", as well as the Martinican writer and theoretician, Edouard Glissant's belief that ..." the past resides in material objects that only release their hidden meanings when encountered imaginatively and sensuously".  Betancourt admires the works of diverse artists such as Fernando Oller, Bill Viola, Cisco Gimenez, Marilyn Minter, Cindy Sherman, Damien Hirst, Félix González-Torres, Jeff Koons and Arnaldo Roche.

Betancourt's oeuvre also explores the kaleidoscope (multi-racial, multi-lingual, trans-cultural) of the Caribbean and American culture. His work is also known for his glitzy bravado, re-introducing glitter and other colored materials to contemporary art. His ways of blending the lines between art, photography and nature in his large-format vinyl, photographs, installations and photo performances are considered highly innovative. Some of his artworks reflect influences of his contemporaries, although his work defies specific categorization.

Life
Betancourt's journey—physical, emotional, and intellectual—is the creative force behind his work. Born and raised in Puerto Rico to Cuban parents, he developed a love for nature and the rainforest and a passionate interest in the syncretic cultures and traditions of the Caribbean, including its Taíno culture heritage. Like Caribbean culture, some of Betancourt's work is a syncretic layering of information against the intensity of the lush tropics.

After saving money for three years, he purchased by mail order catalog his first camera, a Canon AE-1.  He was twelve years old. He took pictures of landscapes and his friends and used the photographs to create collages and as reference for oil and acrylic paintings.  During this time, he was also a young painting student of Puerto Rican cubist artist Jorge Rechany in his studio in San Juan.  He attended high school in Puerto Rico at Colegio La Piedad (also in San Juan).

As a young teen, Betancourt moved to Miami with his parents on December 31, 1980. The clashing of diverse cultures, as well as the convergence of diverse architectural and design styles immediately influenced him. He studied at Miami Coral Park Senior High School and during this time he quickly became involved in art projects, volunteering in artists Christo and Jeanne Claude world-renowned Surrounded Islands monumental installation (1983) in Biscayne Bay and Miami Beach.  While in Miami, Christo and Jeanne Claude stayed in an Art Deco hotel in the now-famous Ocean Drive, (Miami Beach). Hardly any tourist will visit Miami Beach in the 1980s. Betancourt made his way to Ocean Drive to see where the artists were staying, as he had heard some interesting comments about the buildings in the area. While visiting Ocean Drive, Betancourt was instantly moved by the then unkempt Art Deco and Mid-Century buildings of the area. He saw inspirations and potential in the history of the city and the elderly community, blending with the few surfers and interesting characters that lived amongst the many run-down buildings.  It was a very dangerous and run-down community, yet it had an edge that Betancourt considered inspiring and provocative, and he saw the possibility of the shape of things to come. Once he finished art school, he made it his mission to return to Miami Beach.

In general, the brief experience of visiting Miami Beach back then, and volunteering for the Surrounded Islands project had a huge influence on Betancourt, and the artist will later go on to open his studio Imperfect Utopia in Miami Beach.  From this studio, he went on to absorb the feeling of the times and develop works reflecting it. Betancourt also began working on several large scales and ephemeral art installations inspired by the Surrounded Islands

After high school, Betancourt went on to study architecture at Miami Dade Community College and graduated from the Art Institute of Fort Lauderdalein 1987. Following graduation, the artist moved to Miami Beach and became part of an important group of early preservationist working with MDPL (Miami Design Preservation League) that helped shape the renaissance of Miami Beach in the 1980s. Together with his friends and preservationists Barbara Capitman and Leonard Horowitz, he helped protect and preserved many Art Deco buildings in the now world-famous and largest Art Deco district in the world. Sometimes the tactics included tying himself to some of the buildings, such as the Senator Hotel, a significant Art Deco hotel that was unfortunately demolished. His interest in history also developed into an early effort to create awareness for mid-century architecture, particularly the buildings of Morris Lapidus, who the artist admired and had developed a friendship with at this time. Betancourt's assistant during this period, Terry D' Amico, coined the term MiMo, for Miami Modernist architecture.  Working with the preservation league had a big impact on Betancourt's early artwork.

Imperfect Utopia
He opened his studio, Imperfect Utopia, in Miami Beach right after art school and while volunteering for the preservation league. It was first located in Washington Avenue in the back room of a vintage store called Heydays and next door to The Strand, an edgy restaurant that attracted the likes of all creative types, including artist David Hockney, Ed Ruscha, Keith Haring as well as Paloma Picasso during the Miami Beach underground years.

Rent was cheap everywhere in the beach, so when his futuristic furniture won the monetary prize from the Florida Furniture Competition, he moved Imperfect Utopia to the old architecture offices of Murray Dixon off Lenox and Lincoln Road.  A friend had turned the space into a temporary underground club called Avenue A.  It was a very successful club with a particular scene. Betancourt attended regularly.  After a suspicious fire made it no longer attractive as a club, Betancourt offered to take on the remaining of the lease.  He was there for a couple of years before moving the studio to its last address right on Lincoln Road.

Imperfect Utopia became the Bohemian underground address of the artistic melting pot that was Miami Beach in the '80s and '90s, challenging the established art community and provoking new ideas. The studio was visited by some of the most important artists, writers, poets, architects, dancers and musicians of the period, including Julian Schnabel, Sandra Bernhard, Gianni Versace, Morris Lapidus, Liz Balmazeda, Octavio Paz, Celia Cruz, Rudolph Nureyev, Liz Balmaseda and Bruce Weber and the late Cab Calloway, who was hosted during a special event by the artist and the Miami Design Preservation League.

The juxtaposition of personalities and trans-culturalism that evolved during the Imperfect Utopia years and the Miami Beach renaissance provoked the artist to work in compositions loaded with collages and layering, blending and mixing, eventually creating his own syncretic world. There he worked intensively to find his voice, experimenting with silk-screening techniques over and under acrylic paint. He and some of his peers used the display windows of the studio as a platform for constant experimental installations.  During this period, the artist worked on what he called Fracturism the idea that individuals or ideas may never feel complete but fractured, because of the disorganized aspect of information.  Fracturism was "a longing to assemble all that we know, an archaic need to create memories and organized them"...We had yet to carry our photo albums in our pockets, neatly organized in our smartphones” the artist had said of Fracturism. In part, this was a reflection of the times, where information was still disorganized, and Google had yet to make its appearance organizing thoughts and history more conventionally. "We had yet to carry our photo albums in our pockets, neatly organized in our smartphones" the artist has also said of this time.  Betancourt series by the same name, Fracturism (1993), resulted in compositions loaded with contradictory information and the works are executed with multiple mediums, including silk screening, color pencil and painting.  These works already show the artist interest in collage as a way of layering information and resolving his visual ideas.

Imperfect Utopia was in part instrumental in the Miami and Miami Beach renaissance and for creating a contemporary arts environment in Miami and Miami Beach.

During the Imperfect Utopia years, and on until the late 1990s, Betancourt was part of the South Florida Art Center based in Miami Beach, Florida.  he studios and main offices were located within walking distance of the artist studio. Betancourt exchanged ideas, collaborated or exhibited with some of the artists of the center as well as the Española Art Center, including Craig Coleman, Carlos Alves and Kenny Sharf amongst others.

Beyond Imperfect Utopia and Fracturism
After the gentrification of Miami Beach, Betancourt moved his studio to downtown Miami. At the same time, he volunteered in the archaeological site called the Miami Circle, an ancient Tequesta Indian site that was discovered in the mouth of the Miami River. This experience further influenced the artist work and his passion for history. His studio in downtown became also an experimental ground for young artists like Martin Oppel, Bhakti Baxter and Daniel Arsham, who the artist had mentored a couple of years before.  Betancourt produced a series of acrylic and mixed media works on canvas during this time, titled Images of Heaven, where he explored probably for the last time directly, the concept of Fracturism.  These works eventually lead to the exhibit by the same name at St. Thomas University Gallery in Miami.

Betancourt went on to experiment with three-dimensional wall assemblages rooted more in the neo-primitive as a way of finding the art in the archaic. This is best expressed with The Sounds Symbols Project (2000), a monumental ephemeral installation in the sand in Miami Beach. With this work, the artist unconsciously uses the past and explores it in contemporary settings. The best way of appreciating the scale of this work was in a helicopter ride.  The installation made news internationally.
Between paintings and installations, he continued experimenting with photography eventually producing the first large format vinyl with the series The Worshipping of Our Ancestors and Interventions in Nature. He concluded that these works were made from a profound need to start from the beginning, the primitive.  In that way, he could organize the information he has accumulated and absorbed through the years to be able to move beyond Fracturism and into the realm of memory, which was becoming clearly his main source of inspiration.

The Art of Memory
Betancourt's work eventually captured the eye of art dealer Robert Miller of Robert Miller Gallery in NY, one of the top galleries in the world. Betancourt signed with the gallery and in 2001.  That same year, the artist had his first gallery solo show in NYC, exhibiting the works from the large format vinyl.

He was one of the first artists to move to Wynwood in Miami, where a new underground arts community was ready to form. Some of the artworks from this epoch include Interventions in Wynwood series (2003, I and II), produced in the studio backyard, and the installation Intervention with Aracoel Object, (2001) consisting of dozens of elements covered in blue glitter sitting above a neatly packed pile of soil. The objects belonged to his late grandmother and the work explores the memory that is embedded in objects.

Looking into the past and into memories, Betancourt embraces Puerto Rico and the Caribbean, amongst many other places.  He traveled to Cuba during this time. And in one of his many trips to the rain forest in Puerto Rico with architect Alberto Latorre, they found a quaint and beautiful bed and breakfast where he could work from. Betancourt created many artworks from this enchanted place, such as Three Pointer in el Rio Blanco (2002), Petroglyphs and Surfer Shorts, (2003), Bejigante en Casa Flamboyant (2006) and the series Sunday Afternoon in El Yunque (2008), and The Enchanted Garden, (2008). Here he also worked on the Re-Collections series (2008 and on) a photo collage of hundreds of clip art elements composed in an almost kaleidoscope shape. The artist continues to produce works from the rainforest and eventually become co-owner with Alberto Latorre of the land next door to the bed and breakfast, a land that includes some majestic waterfalls that can be seen in some of his works.

Immediate memories became also immediate artworks, as can be seen, reflected in the works from El Portal series, (2011) inspired by the experiences and the surrounding of the neighborhood (El Portal, Miami) and the house where the artist currently lives.

From his studio in Little River, Miami (Little Haiti), he developed, in collaboration with architect Alberto Latorre, suspended artworks that include the commissioned work Appropriations from El Rio (2013) and Appropriations del Mar y Amor (2014). These works celebrate objects and memory as well as our personal association with them.  The explosive composition, with hundreds of elements, is suspended from the ceiling as if time stood still. Disposable Memories (2012), a wall assemblage series also from this period, is composed of hundreds of jewelry pieces held together by a mostly invisible resin that tricks the eye. Times of Illuminations, (2017) is a large artwork wall assemblage consisting of hundreds of mostly star-shaped Christmas tree toppers that the artist has been collecting for more than ten years.  Exhibited at Primary Projects in Miami, the work has sort of becoming a destination artwork.  With Times of Illuminations, the artist continues to explore issues of memory by using the past and present it in a new context.  The recycled vintage objects in the artwork are removed from their original purpose and delivered t in a magical new setting. The artist has been developing this particular work for many years, collecting these toppers not only because of the memory embedded on them but also because of the intentional beauty inherited in their design. Betancourt has said of this artwork " it is as if recalling all things enchanted to my experience, perhaps even a piece of night sky...." Times of Illuminations appear to have a particular attraction, becoming sort of a destination artwork.  A magic wand activates its illumination.

In October 2015, Carlos Betancourt: Imperfect Utopia was published by Skira/Rizzoli. 
Imperfect Utopia explores Betancourt's body of work with more than 250 images and text by Robert Farris Thompson, dean of the history of Art Department at Yale University, Inaugural poet Richard Blanco and writer and art critic Paul Laster.  The artist has participated in several books signing in museums and institutions nationally and internationally, as well as dialogues with Richard Blanco, Warhol Museum chief curator Jose Diaz, and Bonnie Clearwater, director of NSU Art Museum Fort Lauderdale, amongst others.  The book was received to great success and is currently in the second printing.  It was also selected as Art Book of the month by Interview magazine.

Re-Collections, a mid-career retrospective of the artist artworks, opened at the Museo de Arte Contemporaneo (MAC) in San Juan, Puerto Rico in November 2015. Spread through six different galleries and the Museum's main atrium, the exhibit included almost a hundred works, including several installations, such as the recreation of En La Arena Sabrosa (2004), a floor piece consisting of hundreds of Dixie-cups sandcastles made with sand and soil from the beaches and rivers of Puerto Rico. Like the book, the exhibit received excellent reviews and was selected as Art Forum Magazine Critic's Pick.During Art Basel MB 2016, The Pelican Passage Tide by Side, a large artwork commissioned to the artist by Faena Arts District in celebration of the opening of Rem Koolhaas Faena Forum, was chosen as Condé Nast Vogue magazine top five Art Basel artworks.

In June 2017, Betancourt was invited as a speaker for TEDxRVA TED Talks in Richmond, Virginia.  The presentation, titled The Art of Memory, focused on his artwork and revolved around the theme of memory and change.

Carlos Betancourt IMPRINTED, an exhibition that includes works by the artist from 2001-2017 opened at the Southeast Museum of Photography in Daytona State College, Florida.

Betancourt was the co-founder of 801 Projects, an art studio center that provides studio space for visual artists based in Miami. The artist is currently building his main studio in Little River, Miami Beach, designed in collaboration with architect Alberto Latorre.  He has been actively involved in the preservation of the Miami Marine Stadium, a mid-century architectural masterpiece in Key Biscayne, Florida. He continues to find inspiration on his travels, particularly in Greece, and the rainforest (El Yunque) in Puerto Rico.  Betancourt and Latorre recently established the Betancourt-Latorre foundation, a soon to receive a non-for-profit status foundation that will help foster projects and ideas by artists based in Miami and the Caribbean. In October 2017, the organization raised and collected supplies that were quickly donated to those affected by the damaged created by Hurricane Maria in Puerto Rico.

In 2018 the Orlando Museum of Art held its fifth annual prize for contemporary art exhibit. Betancourt was one of the ten featured artists and his work Let Them Feel Pink (2012) was featured. The work, being a table covered with various objects all painted bright pink, won the exhibit's 2018 People's Choice award.

References

External links
 
"An interview with artist Carlos Betancourt", Latin American Art, February 18, 2010
"Carlos Betancourt", One Art World''
"Carlos Betancourt", Artnet

American artists
Living people
1966 births
People from San Juan, Puerto Rico
Puerto Rican people of Cuban descent
Miami Dade College alumni
American curators